The Solo free routine competition at the 2017 World Championships was held on 17 and 19 July 2017.

Results
The preliminary round was started on 17 July at 19:00. The final was held on 19 July at 11:00.

Green denotes finalists

References

Solo free routine